Rodrigo da Conceição Santos (born 17 July 1993), known as Rodrigo Lobão or simply Lobão, is a Brazilian footballer who plays as a central defender for Linense.

Club career
Born in Salvador, Bahia, Lobão was a Mogi Mirim youth graduate. In February 2014 he was presented at Rio Branco-AC, and made his senior debut on 19 February by starting in a 1–1 away draw against Real Noroeste, for the year's Copa do Brasil.

Lobão scored his first senior goal on 13 April 2014, netting the opener in a 3–0 away win against Vasco da Gama-AC for the Campeonato Acreano championship. He featured regularly for the club during the season, also helping his side win the state league.

In 2015, Lobão joined Ponte Preta and was immediately loaned to Salgueiro for the Campeonato Pernambucano. After his loan expired, he returned to his parent club and made his debut on 7 May, starting in a 2–1 away win against Moto Club for the national cup.

On 30 July 2015, Lobão terminated his contract with Ponte, and joined Linense in October. The following 29 August, after winning the Copa Paulista, he was loaned to Série B side Tupi until the end of the year.

After being a regular starter during the 2017 Campeonato Paulista, Lobão signed a permanent contract with Santos and was loaned to CSA in the Série C, until December. After achieving promotion to the second division as champions, his loan was extended for a further season, but was cut short on 9 May 2018 after he was rarely used.

On 17 November 2018, Lobão joined Bangu also in a temporary deal, for the 2019 Campeonato Carioca. On 3 January 2020, he signed a permanent one-year deal with Bangu after his contract with Santos expired.

Career statistics

Honours
Rio Branco-AC
Campeonato Acreano: 2014

Linense
Copa Paulista: 2015

CSA
Campeonato Brasileiro Série C: 2017
Campeonato Alagoano: 2018

References

External links

1993 births
Living people
Sportspeople from Salvador, Bahia
Brazilian footballers
Association football defenders
Campeonato Brasileiro Série B players
Campeonato Brasileiro Série C players
Campeonato Brasileiro Série D players
Rio Branco Football Club players
Associação Atlética Ponte Preta players
Salgueiro Atlético Clube players
Clube Atlético Linense players
Tupi Football Club players
Santos FC players
Centro Sportivo Alagoano players
Bangu Atlético Clube players